Lactarius quercuum is a member of the large milk-cap genus Lactarius in the order Russulales. Described as new to science in 1963 by American mycologist Rolf Singer, the species is found in Bolivia.

See also
List of Lactarius species

References

External links

quercuum
Fungi described in 1963
Fungi of Bolivia